A list of adventure films released in the 2000s.

2000

2001

2002

2003

2004

2005

2006

2007

2008

2009

Notes

2000s
Adventure